A health crisis or public health crisis is a difficult situation or complex health system that affects humans in one or more geographic areas (mainly occurred in natural hazards), from a particular locality to encompass the entire planet. Health crises generally have significant impacts on community health, loss of life, and on the economy. They may result from disease, industrial processes or poor policy.

Its severity is often measured by the number of people affected by its geographical extent, or the disease or death of the pathogenic process which it originates.

Features 

Generally there are three key components in health crises:
 Public health problem
 Problem health coordination
 Alarm care: Poor communication of risks to the population resulting in social upheaval.

Types 
 Environmental
 Food 
 Toxic

Examples 

 1858: Swill milk scandal
 1905: American meat scandal due to the publishing of Upton Sinclair's book "The Jungle".
 1918-1920: Spanish flu
 1963: Birth defects by thalidomide
 1981: Toxic oil syndrome or simply toxic syndrome
 HIV/AIDS
 1996: Bovine spongiform encephalopathy (BSE), commonly known as mad-cow disease
 1998: Doñana disaster, also known as the Aznalcollar Disaster or Guadiamar Disaster
 2001: Anthrax attacks in the United States, also known as Amerithrax
 2003: Severe acute respiratory syndrome (SARS)
 2004: Avian influenza (H5N1), sometimes avian flu, and commonly bird flu
 2006: Côte d'Ivoire toxic waste dump
 Trans fat toxicity
 2007: Lead paint on toys from China
 2008: The 2008 Chinese milk scandal was a food safety incident in China, involving milk and infant formula, and other food materials and components, adulterated with melamine.
 Canada listeriosis outbreak and Chile
 2009: Pandemic H1N1/09 Influenza
 2010: Haiti earthquake
 2011: Tōhoku earthquake and tsunami 
 E. coli O104:H4 outbreak
 2012: Fraud on breast implants Poly Implant Prothèses (PIP)
 2013-16: Ebola virus epidemic in West Africa
 2015: Zika virus outbreak
 2019-ongoing: COVID-19 pandemic
 2022: 2022 monkeypox outbreak

Prevention and control 
 Using the health warning systems. A health system responsive to the needs of the population is required to refine the instruments to ensure adequate preparation before their hatching.
 Transparency of the institutions public or private. The perception of crisis can escape the control of experts or health institutions, and be determined by stakeholders to provide solutions propagate or concerned. This requires a difficult balancing of the need to articulate clear answers and the little-founded fears.
 Adequate information policy. Irrationality arise when information is distorted, or hidden. Face a health crisis involves: respect for society, coordination of organizations and an institution with scientific weight to the people and to the media, who acted as spokesman in situations of public health risk, to get confidence citizens. The technical capacity of health professionals is more proven than the public officials, which suggests a greater share of the former and better training of the second.
 Evaluate the previous crisis or others experiences. Crises are challenges that must be learned from both the mistakes and successes, since they serve to bring about to the devices and improve the response to other crises. It is important to perform analysis of previous responses, audit risk and vulnerability, research and testing, and drills to prepare themselves against future crises.
 Having objectives: "first, to reduce the impact of illness and death, and second, to avoid social fracture".
 Preparing contingency plans. Preparation is key to the crisis because it allows a strong response, organized, and scientifically based. Action plans must meet the professional early enough and properly trained, and politicians must be consistent in their actions and coordinate all available resources. It is essential to invest in public health resources to prepare preventive measures and reducing health inequalities to minimize the impact of health crises, as they generally always the poorest suffer most.
 It is important to include all health professions especially primary health care (family physicians, pharmacists, etc.), as often it is these practitioners that are on the front-line in health crises.

See also 

 Crisis theory
 Disease mongering
 Health administration
 Health care
 Health policy
 Medicalization
 Primary health care
 Routine health outcomes measurement
 Thalidomide

References

Bibliography 
 Bashir SA. Home Is Where the Harm Is: Inadequate Housing as a Public Health Crisis. American Journal of Public Health. 2002; 92(5):733-8.
 Gross J. The Next Public Health Crisis: Longevity. The New York Times. 2010/10/21.
 Navarro V. Spain is experiencing a Period of intense Social Crisis. Social Europe Journal. 12/11/2012.

External links

CDCynergy  
 International Journal of Information Systems for Crisis Response and Management (IJISCRAM)
WHO: Humanitarian Health Action
US Health Crisis

Crisis
Health disasters
Health policy
Public health